Clandestiny, published in 1996 by Virgin Games and developed by Trilobyte, is a video-based puzzle computer game. After the profit loss of The 11th Hour, the second game created by Trilobyte, the producers went on to make a more kid-friendly version of The 7th Guest series. The game was re-released in January 2011 on the Mac App Store.

Gameplay
Clandestiny is the third puzzle game made by Trilobyte, and provides an interesting mix of first-person gameplay and third-person cartoon. Like that of The 7th Guest and The 11th Hour, the game is played by wandering a castle, solving logic puzzles and watching animated videos that further the story. The main protagonist, Andrew MacPhiles, grows as a character and learns the secrets of his family's past along with the help of an array of characters who further the story giving clues and hints along the way.

A fairly simple plot is played out by animated characters through animated clips as you progress between rooms by solving puzzles of shifting nature and increasing difficulty. The puzzles include mazes, chess problems, logical deductions, and word manipulations. Another re-hash of the previous games is the cursors used in the game, which are exact copies of those from the preceding games.

Plot
The story is of a young man named Andrew J. MacPhiles (voiced by W. Morgan Sheppard) who has recently inherited a Scottish castle, being the last MacPhiles standing, full of ghosts, and an earldom along with it. With his girlfriend Paula (who wants to be the next Countess MacPhiles) and a friendly handyman named Fergus, Andrew must solve the mystery of the MacPhiles curse.

Development
During development the game was to be titled "Castle". All backgrounds were designed and drawn using Autodesk 3D. The characters were drawn and animated using Animo, which was also used to draw sketches before being rendered by Autodesk. So many images were produced that they had to be stored in an entire room.

Reception

Clandestiny sold 20,000 units.

References

External links

1996 video games
MacOS games
Puzzle video games
ScummVM-supported games
Video games developed in the United States
Video games set in castles
Video games set in Scotland
Virgin Interactive games
Windows games